The Catalonia national rugby league team represents Catalonia in the sport of rugby league football, running under the auspices of the Associació Catalana de Rugby Lliga.

History
Rugby league started in Catalonia in autumn 2007, with the advice of people from the French Catalan region, where this sport has been played since the 1930s.

The number of clubs grew since 3 clubs participated in the first competition in southern Catalonia in 2008 (FC Barcelona, Aligots Girona and Nord-Català), to reach 9 teams in the first Catalonia Championships in April 2009: CR Tarragona, CR Valls, CR Sant Cugat, INEF Lleida, GEiEG, Poble Nou Enginyers, BUC, RC Garrotxa and Vic Crancs. Also, the first Rugby League Catalan University Championship was played in February 2009, with 9 teams in competition.

Catalonia used to be an unranked member of the Rugby League European Federation; however, their participation in some international rugby league competitions, such as the World Cup, has been questioned as Catalonia is not a sovereign nation.

Catalonia played their first match in January 2008 when they participated in the French Interleague Championship held near Perpignan, France. In June of the same year, Morocco beat Catalonia in a match played in Perpignan, 62–12.

In June 2009, Catalonia beat the Czech Republic in a match played prior to the Catalans Dragons vs Warrington Wolves Super League game. This match was an international warm-up ahead of the Euro Med Challenge contested by Catalonia, Morocco and Belgium. They lost 6–29 at home to Morocco, and 28–22 at Belgium.

In 2010 Catalonia played only friendlies, with a win over Czech Republic 16–66 in Prague.

Following further disputes over their RLEF status, the Catalonia national team did not subsequently participate in international competition and their RLEF affiliation was later dropped. They are currently not active in international competition, and any further international activity will likely fall under the umbrella of the Spain national rugby league team.

All-time results

Team matches to date

Players

2009

2010

See also
 Associació Catalana de Rugby Lliga
 Rugby League European Federation
 Catalans Dragons

References

External links
 Catalan Rugby League Association
 Rugby League European Federation
 Highlights video: Catalonia-Morocco
 Highlights video: Belgium-Catalonia

National rugby league teams
Rugby league
Rugby league in Catalonia